Hooker is an unincorporated community in Dade County, in the U.S. state of Georgia.

History
A post office called Hooker was established in 1890, and remained in operation until 1896. The community was named after Joseph Hooker (1814–1879), American Civil War major general.

References

Unincorporated communities in Dade County, Georgia